The 2005 provincial elections of Sardinia took place on 8–9 May 2005.

All the Provinces of Sardinia, including the newly established ones (Olbia-Tempio, Medio Campidano, Ogliastra and Carbonia-Iglesias), elected their Presidents and Provincial Councils. A run-off was needed in Olbia-Tempio and took place two weeks later. The elections saw a big victory for the centre-left, which won seven provinces out of eight.

Results

Presidents

|- 
!align=left rowspan=2 valign=center bgcolor="#E9E9E9"|
!colspan="3" align="center" valign=top bgcolor="lightblue"|House of Freedoms
!colspan="3" align="center" valign=top bgcolor="pink"|The Union
!colspan="3" align="center" valign=top bgcolor="lightgreen"|Independence Republic of Sardinia
!colspan="1" align="center" valign=top bgcolor="#E9E9E9"|Others
|-
|align="left" bgcolor="lightblue"|candidate
|align="center" bgcolor="lightblue"|1st round
|align="center" bgcolor="lightblue"|2nd round
|align="left" bgcolor="pink"|candidate
|align="center" bgcolor="pink"|1st round
|align="center" bgcolor="pink"|2nd round
|align="left" bgcolor="lightgreen"|candidate
|align="center" bgcolor="lightgreen"|1st round
|align="center" bgcolor="lightgreen"|2nd round
|align="center" bgcolor="#E9E9E9"|1st round
|-
|align="left" valign=top bgcolor="#E9E9E9" |Cagliari
|align="left" valign=top bgcolor="lightblue"|Mariano Delogu(National Alliance)
|align="center" valign=top bgcolor="lightblue"|51.8%
|align="center" valign=top bgcolor="lightblue"|-
|align="left" valign=top bgcolor="pink"|Graziano Milia(Democrats of the Left)
|align="center" valign=top bgcolor="pink"|44.2%
|align="center" valign=top bgcolor="pink"|-
|align="left" valign=top bgcolor="lightgreen"|Elisabetta Pitzurra(IRS)
|align="center" valign=top bgcolor="lightgreen"|0.8%
|align="center" valign=top bgcolor="lightgreen"|-
|align="center" valign=top bgcolor="#E9E9E9"|3.2%
|-
|align="left" valign=top bgcolor="#E9E9E9" |Carbonia-Iglesias
|align="left" valign=top bgcolor="lightblue"|Antonio Macciò(Union of Christian Democrats)
|align="center" valign=top bgcolor="lightblue"|39.5%
|align="center" valign=top bgcolor="lightblue"|-
|align="left" valign=top bgcolor="pink"|Pierfranco Gaviano(Democracy is Freedom)
|align="center" valign=top bgcolor="pink"|54.9%
|align="center" valign=top bgcolor="pink"|-
|align="left" valign=top bgcolor="lightgreen"|Giovannino Sedda(IRS)
|align="center" valign=top bgcolor="lightgreen"|0.9%
|align="center" valign=top bgcolor="lightgreen"|-
|align="center" valign=top bgcolor="#E9E9E9"|4.7%
|-
|align="left" valign=top bgcolor="#E9E9E9" |Medio Campidano
|align="left" valign=top bgcolor="lightblue"|Francesco Atzori(Forza Italia)
|align="center" valign=top bgcolor="lightblue"|24.4%
|align="center" valign=top bgcolor="lightblue"|-
|align="left" valign=top bgcolor="pink"|Fulvio Tocco(Democrats of the Left)
|align="center" valign=top bgcolor="pink"|67.2%
|align="center" valign=top bgcolor="pink"|-
|align="left" valign=top bgcolor="lightgreen"|Francesco Sedda(IRS)
|align="center" valign=top bgcolor="lightgreen"|1.4%
|align="center" valign=top bgcolor="lightgreen"|-
|align="center" valign=top bgcolor="#E9E9E9"|7.0%
|-
|align="left" valign=top bgcolor="#E9E9E9" |Nuoro
|align="left" valign=top bgcolor="lightblue"|Silvestro Ladu(Fortza Paris)
|align="center" valign=top bgcolor="lightblue"|29.2%
|align="center" valign=top bgcolor="lightblue"|-
|align="left" valign=top bgcolor="pink"|Roberto Deriu(Democracy is Freedom)
|align="center" valign=top bgcolor="pink"|60.4%
|align="center" valign=top bgcolor="pink"|-
|align="left" valign=top bgcolor="lightgreen"|Pasqualina Soro(IRS)
|align="center" valign=top bgcolor="lightgreen"|1.4%
|align="center" valign=top bgcolor="lightgreen"|-
|align="center" valign=top bgcolor="#E9E9E9"|9.0%
|-
|align="left" valign=top bgcolor="#E9E9E9" |Ogliastra
|align="left" valign=top bgcolor="lightblue"|Attilio Murru(Forza Italia)
|align="center" valign=top bgcolor="lightblue"|34.1%
|align="center" valign=top bgcolor="lightblue"|
|align="left" valign=top bgcolor="pink"|Pier Luigi Carta(Democratic Socialists)
|align="center" valign=top bgcolor="pink"|59.9%
|align="center" valign=top bgcolor="pink"|-
|align="left" valign=top bgcolor="lightgreen"|-
|align="center" valign=top bgcolor="lightgreen"|-
|align="center" valign=top bgcolor="lightgreen"|-
|align="center" valign=top bgcolor="#E9E9E9"|6.0%
|-
|align="left" valign=top bgcolor="#E9E9E9" |Olbia-Tempio
|align="left" valign=top bgcolor="lightblue"|Livio Fideli(Forza Italia)
|align="center" valign=top bgcolor="lightblue"|46.5%
|align="center" valign=top bgcolor="lightblue"|48.6%
|align="left" valign=top bgcolor="pink"|Anna Murrighile(Sardinia Project)
|align="center" valign=top bgcolor="pink"|46.8%
|align="center" valign=top bgcolor="pink"|51.9%
|align="left" valign=top bgcolor="lightgreen"|Giovanni Pala(IRS)
|align="center" valign=top bgcolor="lightgreen"|1.4%
|align="center" valign=top bgcolor="lightgreen"|-
|align="center" valign=top bgcolor="#E9E9E9"|5.3%
|-
|align="left" valign=top bgcolor="#E9E9E9" |Oristano
|align="left" valign=top bgcolor="lightblue"|Pasquale Onida(Fortza Paris)
|align="center" valign=top bgcolor="lightblue"|52.4%
|align="center" valign=top bgcolor="lightblue"|-
|align="left" valign=top bgcolor="pink"|Silvano Cadoni(Sardinian Action Party)
|align="center" valign=top bgcolor="pink"|45.0%
|align="center" valign=top bgcolor="pink"|-
|align="left" valign=top bgcolor="lightgreen"|Francesco Sanna(IRS)
|align="center" valign=top bgcolor="lightgreen"|1.9%
|align="center" valign=top bgcolor="lightgreen"|-
|align="center" valign=top bgcolor="#E9E9E9"|0.7%
|-
|align="left" valign=top bgcolor="#E9E9E9" |Sassari
|align="left" valign=top bgcolor="lightblue"|Stefano Poddighe(Sardinian Reformers)
|align="center" valign=top bgcolor="lightblue"|32.7%
|align="center" valign=top bgcolor="lightblue"|-
|align="left" valign=top bgcolor="pink"|Alessandra Giudici(Democracy is Freedom)
|align="center" valign=top bgcolor="pink"|60.7%
|align="center" valign=top bgcolor="pink"|
|align="left" valign=top bgcolor="lightgreen"|Gavino Sale(IRS)
|align="center" valign=top bgcolor="lightgreen"|4.1%
|align="center" valign=top bgcolor="lightgreen"|-
|align="center" valign=top bgcolor="#E9E9E9"|2.5%
|}Source: Ministry of the Interior

Parties
Source: Ministry of the Interior

Elections in Sardinia
Sardinia
2005 elections in Italy
May 2005 events in Europe